

Events and trends

 c. 1356 BC – Amenhotep IV begins the worship of Aten in Ancient Egypt, changing his name to Akhenaten and moving the capital to Akhetaten, starting the Amarna Period.
 c. 1352 BC – Amenhotep III (Eighteenth Dynasty of Egypt) dies and is succeeded as Pharaoh by Amenhotep IV.
 1350 BC – Yin becomes the new capital of Shang dynasty China.

References